This is a list of the moths of family Noctuidae (sensu Kitching & Rawlins, 1999) which are found in Chile. It also acts as an index to the species articles and forms part of the full List of moths of Chile. Subfamilies are listed alphabetically.

Subfamily Acronictinae
Spodoptera albula (Walker, 1857)
Spodoptera eridania (Cramer, 1782)
Spodoptera frugiperda (Smith, 1797)
Spodoptera mauritia (Boisduval, 1833)
Spodoptera ochrea (Hampson, 1909)

Subfamily Amphipyrinae
Athetis nigrifrons (Dognin, 1919)
Crimona nana Angulo y Olivares, 1999
Elaphria bucephalina (Mabille, 1885)

Subfamily Catocalinae
Achaea janata (Linnaeus, 1758)
Anticarsia gemmatalis Huebner, 1816
Ascalapha odorata (Linnaeus, 1758)
Euclidia runica Felder, 1874/Caenurgia runica Felder
Euclidia vittata Phillipi
Melipotis cellaris (Guenée, 1836)
Melipotis paracellaris Angulo, 1984
Melipotis trujillensis Dognin, 1905
Melipotis walkeri (Butler, 1875)
Mocis disseverans (Walker, 1858)
Mocis latipes (Guenée, 1852)
Mocis megas (Guenée, 1852)
Ophideres apta (Walker, 1858)
Zale lunata (Drury, 1770)

Subfamily Cuculliinae
Albirenia araucanica (Hampson, 1909)
Albirenia minense Angulo y Olivares, 1999
Albirenia transversalis Rodriguez y Olivares, 2000
Andesia lesa (Koehler, 1979)
Copitarsia anatunca Angulo y Olivares, 1999
Copitarsia anguloi Castillo, 1991
Copitarsia basilinea Koehler, 1958
Copitarsia clavata (Koehler, 1952)
Copitarsia humilis (Blanchard, 1852)
Copitarsia murina Angulo, Olivares y Badilla, 2001
Copitarsia naenoides (Butler, 1882)
Copitarsia paraturbata Castillo & Angulo, 1991
Copitarsia patagonica Hampson, 1906
Copitarsia turbata (Herrich-Schäffer, 1855)
Pseudocerura thoracica Butler, 1882
Tenera andina (Koehler, 1979)
Tenera purpuracea (Angulo & Olivares, 2000)

Subfamily Hadeninae
Chabuata carneago (Guerin, 1852)
Dargida confundibilis (Koehler, 1989)
Dargida permira (Draudt, 1924)
Dargida tetragona (Mabille, 1885)
Eriopyga perfusca Hampson, 1905
Helicocervix ommatoblonga Angulo y Olivares, 1999
Helicocervix penai Angulo y Olivares, 1999
Leucania impuncta Guenée, 1852
Mythimna loreyi (Duponchel, 1827)
Pehuenquenia minuta Angulo y Olivares, 1999
Pseudaletia punctulata (Blanchard, 1852)
Scriptania badillai Rodríguez, 1999
Scriptania chuzmiza Angulo y Olivares, 1999
Scriptania cinerea Rodríguez y Angulo, 2001
Scriptania cuculloides Angulo y Olivares, 1999
Scriptania fallax Rodríguez, 1999
Scriptania fasciata Angulo y Olivares, 1999
Scriptania godoyi Olivares, 1993
Scriptania inexpectata Rodríguez, 1998
Scriptania leucofasciata Rodríguez, 1999
Scriptania marcelae Angulo y Olivares, 1999
Scriptania maulina Rodríguez & Angulo, 2001
Scriptania paragodoyi Rodríguez & Olivares, 2001
Scriptania plumbica (Koehler, 1959)
Scriptania rubroides Rodríguez & Angulo, 2001
Scriptania viridipennis Rodríguez & Angulo, 2001
Scriptania yajminense Rodríguez & Olivares, 2001
Strigania albilinea (Huebner, 1821)

Subfamily Heliothinae
Heliothis atacamae (Hardwick, 1965)
Heliothis gelotopoeon (Dyar, 1921)
Heliothis virescens (Fabricius, 1777)
Heliothis zea (Boddie, 1850)
Schinia chilensis (Hampson, 1903)
Schinia gabrielae Badilla & Angulo, 1998

Subfamily Noctuinae
Agrotis araucaria (Hampson, 1903)
Agrotis andina (Köhler, 1945)
Agrotis bilitura Guenée, 1852
Agrotis coquimbensis (Hampson, 1903)
Agrotis dissociata Staudinger, 1899
Agrotis edmondsi Butler, 1882
Agrotis experta (Walker, 1869)
Agrotis hispidula Guenée, 1852
Agrotis ipsilon (Hufnagel, 1766)
Agrotis malefida Guenée, 1852
Agrotis subterranea (Fabricius, 1794)
Atlantagrotis nelida (Köhler, 1945)
Atlantagrotis aethes (Mabille, 1885)
Beriotisia copahuensis (Köhler, 1967)
Beriotisia cuculliformis (Köhler, 1945)
Beriotisia fueguensis (Hampson, 1907)
Beriotisia taniae Angulo & Olivares, 1999
Beriotisia typhlina (Mabille, 1885)
Blepharoa mamestrina (Butler, 1882)
Boursinidia atrimedia (Hampson, 1907)
Boursinidia darwini (Staudinger, 1899)
Euxoamorpha ceciliae Angulo & Rodríguez, 1998
Euxoamorpha eschata Franclemont, 1950
Euxoamorpha ingoufii (Mabille, 1885)
Euxoamorpha mendosica (Hampson, 1903)
Euxoamorpha molibdoida (Staudinger, 1899)
Janaesia antarctica (Staudinger, 1899)
Janaesia carnea (Druce, 1903)
Janaesia exclusiva Angulo & Olivares, 1999
Janaesia hibernans (Köhler, 1968)
Magnagrotis oorti (Köhler, 1945)
Noctubourgognea bicolor (Mabille, 1885)
Noctubourgognea coppingeri (Butler, 1881)
Noctubourgognea glottuloides (Butler, 1882)
Pareuxoa flavicosta (Wallengren, 1860)
Pareuxoa fuscata Angulo & Olivares, 1999
Pareuxoa gravida (Mabille, 1885)
Pareuxoa janae Angulo, 1990
Pareuxoa koehleri Olivares, 1992
Pareuxoa lineifera (Blanchard, 1852)
Pareuxoa luteicosta Angulo & Olivares, 1999
Pareuxoa meditata Köhler, 1967
Pareuxoa nigrolineata (Jana-Sáenz, 1989)
Pareuxoa parajanae Olivares, 1992
Pareuxoa perdita (Staudinger, 1889)
Pareuxoa sanctisebastiani Köhler, 1954
Peridroma ambrosioides (Walker, 1857)
Peridroma chilenaria Angulo & Jana-Sáenz, 1984
Peridroma clerica (Butler, 1882)
Peridroma saucia (Hübner, [1808])
Phaenagrotis hecateia Köhler, 1953
Pseudoleucania brosii (Köhler, 1959)
Pseudoleucania diana (Butler, 1882)
Pseudoleucania ferruginescens (Blanchard, 1852)
Pseudoleucania leucaniiformis (Zerny, 1916)
Pseudoleucania luteomaculata Angulo & Olivares, 2001
Pseudoleucania marii Köhler, 1979
Pseudoleucania onerosa (Köhler, 1959)
Scania anelluspinata Olivares, 1994
Scania aspersa (Butler, 1882)
Scania messia (Guenée, 1852)
Scania neuquensis (Köhler, 1959)
Scania odontoclasper Olivares, 1994
Scania perlucida (Köhler, 1967)
Scania perornata (Köhler, 1959)
Scania simillima (Köhler, 1959)
Scania strigigrapha (Hampson, 1905)
Scania tephra (Köhler, 1945)
Tisagronia pexa (Berg, 1877)

Subfamily Plusiinae
Argyrogramma basigera (Walker, 1865)
Autographa biloba (Stephens)
Autographa bonaerensis (Berg)
Autoplusia egena (Guenée, 1852)
Ctenoplusia albostriata (Bremer & Grey)
Chrysodeixis chalcites (Esper)
Pseudoplusia includens Walker
Rachiplusia nu (Guenée)
Rachiplusia virgula (Blanchard)
Syngrapha gammoides (Blanchard)
Trichoplusia ni (Hübner)
Trichoplusia oxygramma (Geyer, 1832)

Subfamily Ophiderinae
Ascalapha odorata (Linnaeus, 1758)
Anticarsia gemmatalis Hübner, 1818
Gonodonta pyrgo (Cramer, [1777])
Letis scops Guenée
Melipotis cellaris (Guenée, 1852)
Melipotis paracellaris Angulo
Melipotis trujillensis Dognin
Melipotis walkeri (Butler)
Ophideres apta (Walker, [1858])

External links
Noctuinae of Chile
Macrolepidópteros Heteróceros de Chile y de sus áreas adyacentes

.N
Chile
Moths, Noctuidae